Woodend railway station is located on the Deniliquin line in Victoria, Australia. It serves the town of Woodend, and it opened on 8 July 1861.

In December 1897, the original station building was destroyed by fire.

In 1960, a crossover at the Up end of the station was abolished.

The station once had extra sidings on the far side of Platform 2, as well as a turntable. The sidings were abolished in February 1990, whilst the turntable was relocated to Castlemaine in the early 1990s, for use by the Victorian Goldfields Railway.

In March 1995, the signal box was abolished, and was replaced with a signal bay within the Platform 1 station building. A crossover at the Down end of the station and the turntable road were also abolished by March of that year. On 17 January 2005, the signal bay itself was abolished.

The original stationmaster's house still stands. It was built in 1897, and at the time, the stationmaster was able to see along the track from the doorways.

Disused station Carlsruhe is located between Woodend and Kyneton stations.

Platforms and services

Woodend has two side platforms. During the morning peak, services to Melbourne depart from Platform 2, and services to Bendigo depart from Platform 1. This is reversed after 8:30am, to allow services in the peak direction of travel to utilise the single 160 km/h track that was upgraded in 2006, as part of the Regional Fast Rail project.

It is serviced by V/Line Bendigo, Echuca and Swan Hill line services.

Platform 1:
 services to Kyneton, Bendigo, Epsom, Eaglehawk and Southern Cross
 services to Echuca and Southern Cross
 services to Swan Hill and Southern Cross

Platform 2:
 services to Kyneton, Bendigo, Epsom, Eaglehawk and Southern Cross
 services to Echuca and Southern Cross
 services to Swan Hill and Southern Cross

Transport links

Dysons operates one route via Woodend station, under contract to Public Transport Victoria:

References

External links
Victorian Railway Stations gallery
Melway map at street-directory.com.au

Railway stations in Australia opened in 1861
Regional railway stations in Victoria (Australia)